Osteochilus partilineatus is a species of cyprinid fish endemic to West Kalimantan, Indonesia.

References

Taxa named by Maurice Kottelat
Fish described in 1995
Osteochilus